The WAGR K class was a single member class of 0-6-2T tank locomotive used intermittently by the Western Australian Government Railways (WAGR) between 1891 and 1926.

History
The K class engine was built in 1891 by Hudswell, Clarke & Co, Leeds, for the construction of Fremantle Harbour. It entered service with the Public Works Department, moving later the same year to WAGR as K19.

The locomotive was used subsequently on a number of other construction projects, passing into and out of WAGR ownership on several occasions with the Public Works Department, Goldfields Water Supply Administration and Fremantle Harbour Works Department operating it at various times across the state from Geraldton in the north to Bunbury in the south. When it made one of its returns to WAGR ownership in 1903, the class designation had been reallocated to another class along with number 19, so it was reclassified as L5.

In 1926 it was stored at Midland Railway Workshops and scrapped in about 1931.

Namesakes
The K class designation was reused by the K class locomotives introduced in 1893 and again in the 1960s when the K class diesel locomotives entered service.

See also

History of rail transport in Western Australia
List of Western Australian locomotive classes

References

Notes

Cited works

External links

Hudswell Clarke locomotives
Railway locomotives introduced in 1891
K WAGR class (1891)
0-6-2T locomotives
3 ft 6 in gauge locomotives of Australia
Freight locomotives